The Tierp List (Swedish: Tierpslistan, TL) is a local political party in Tierp Municipality, Sweden, led by Mio Tastas Viktorsson. The party gained 4.5% of the votes and two seats in municipal assembly of Tierp 2022.

It is inspired and supported by Markus Allard's Örebro party. Much like the Örebro party it supports lowered wages for politicians, stricter migration policy, and free dental care. It also opposes centralisation of public services within the municipality.

Its logo consists of an iron manhole cover of the type produced within the municipality, with the initials TL engraved.

References 

Minor political parties in Sweden
2021 establishments in Sweden
Swedish local political parties